The Horomatangi Reef or reefs is a feature of Lake Taupō, in the central North Island of New Zealand. 

The reef is named after Horomātangi (Horo-matangi), the tāniwha or water monster of the lake, who is said to reside in a cave adjacent to the nearby Motutaiko Island to the south. The name Horomatangi Reefs perhaps better reflects its complex inner and outer structure with the shallow reefs separated by very deep areas, so tends to be used in the geological literature, while the term reef tends to be used geographically.

Geology
The reefs are at a high heat-output geothermal hot spot area within the Taupō Volcano. Accordingly the reef is perhaps best regarded as a complex volcano within the caldera of another complex volcano. There is one area of 500m diameter dropping to a depth of over 164m below mean lake level.

Contemporary Volcanic Activity
Recent periods of volcanic unrest of the Taupō Volcano have been associated with earthquake swarms centred in the area of the Horomatangi Reef. From February to October 2022 during a period of volcanic unrest the reef had inflated upwards by a mean of  relative to other reference points around Lake Taupō.  A shallow magnitude 5.7 earthquake occurred on 30th November 2022 causing a further upwards inflation of 180mm, being the largest amount of uplift ever recorded to date.

References

Taupō Volcanic Zone
Landforms of Waikato
Volcanism of New Zealand
Māori mythology
Lake Taupō
Reefs of New Zealand
Geothermal areas in New Zealand